Regeti (also Romanized as Regetī; also known as Regetī-ye Pā‘īn and Rīgītī) is a village in Pir Sohrab Rural District, in the Central District of Chabahar County, Sistan and Baluchestan Province, Iran. At the 2006 census, its population was 303, in 57 families.

References 

Populated places in Chabahar County